It's Not Over...The Hits So Far is the first greatest hits album by American rock band Daughtry. It features most of the mainstream singles released from the band's first four studio albums, with two new songs. "Torches" was released on January 29, 2016 as the compilation's lead single.

Background
The album features two original songs, "Torches" and "Go Down", with the former being released as the album's lead single. Frontman Chris Daughtry spoke with Entertainment Weekly about "Torches," saying It took a long time to get to the two songs that we felt were a nice introduction to where this next record may go. “Torches” was an instant favorite at the label. I love working with Dave [Bassett] and I finally got to go out to his house in Malibu, which is the most beautiful setting to write at. You look off his balcony and you see the ocean and the mountains and it’s gorgeous. I was looking at all the dry brush talking about how if someone flicked a cigarette or something the whole place would just go down. It got me thinking about how fire spreads.

We were talking about all the bulls— on the Internet and how people just hate on stuff. We were saying, “What if we used that energy to spread positivity? Would it spread as fast as the hate does?” “All the hate and lies around us like an ember in the brush”: It just started writing itself from everything we were talking about. I think it’s a message that we all need to hear. None of us are impervious to being negative. It’s easier to complain about what’s wrong than it is to talk about what’s going right. We’re all a part of this, whether we want to believe it or not — why don’t we try shining some light in the darkness?

Daughtry then explained the second song "Go Down", saying We were like, “You know what, we already know we’re bringing guitars back on this next record, so why not put it on the greatest hits. Who cares if it goes to radio, this is for the fans.” It’s about letting loose and not really giving a crap. Just… get your freak on. It’s got kind of an indie, heavy alternative vibe. It’s definitely heavy, but it’s got this danceability to it. Almost a little bit of Garbage in there — the band, not the trash.

Track listing

Charts

Band members
Chris Daughtry – lead vocals, rhythm guitar
Josh Paul – bass, backing vocals
Josh Steely – lead guitar, backing vocals
Brian Craddock – rhythm guitar, backing vocals
Brandon Maclin – drums, backing vocals tracks (12–13)
Elvio Fernandes – keyboards, piano, rhythm guitar, acoustic guitar, backing vocals tracks (10–13)
Joey Barnes – drums, piano, backing vocals tracks (1–8)
Jeremy Brady – rhythm guitar, backing vocals tracks (1–5)
Robin Diaz – drums tracks (7,9–11)

Release history

References

Daughtry (band) albums
19 Recordings compilation albums
Albums produced by Howard Benson
RCA Records compilation albums
2016 greatest hits albums